Cloaked by Ages, Crowned in Earth is the third and last album by the American doom metal band Morgion. It was released in 2004 by Dark Symphonies.

Track listing
  "Cloaked by Ages" (1:22)
  "A Slow Succumbing" (Music: Griffith/Boardman, Lyrics: Davis) (9:47)
  "Ebb Tide (Parts I & II)" (Music: Griffith, Lyrics: Davis) (13:04)
  "Trillium Rune" (Music: Boardman) (3:37)
  "The Mourner's Oak" (Music: Griffith, Lyrics: Davis) (6:06)
  "Cairn" (Music: Boardman/Griffith/Christian, Lyrics: Davis) (6:46)
  "She, The Master Covets" (Music: Griffith, Lyrics: Davis) (5:22)
  "Crowned In Earth/Lull (Hidden Track)" (Music: Griffith, Lyrics: Davis) (15:25)

References

2004 albums
Morgion (band) albums